The Spanish–American War (desastre del 98, Guerra Hispano-Cubana-Norteamericana or Guerra de Cuba ) was a military conflict between Spain and the United States that began in April 1898.  Hostilities halted in August of that year, and the Treaty of Paris was signed in December.

The war began after the American demand for Spain's peacefully resolving the Cuban fight for independence was rejected, though strong expansionist sentiment in the United States may have motivated the government to target Spain's remaining overseas territories: Cuba, Puerto Rico, the Philippines, Guam and the Caroline Islands.

Riots in Havana by pro-Spanish "Voluntarios" gave the United States a reason to send in the warship  to indicate high national interest. The war ended after decisive naval victories for the United States in the Philippines and Cuba.

The Treaty of Paris ended the conflict 109 days after the outbreak of war giving the United States ownership of the former Spanish colonies of Puerto Rico, the Philippines and Guam.

The Medal of Honor was created during the American Civil War and is the highest military decoration presented by the United States government to a member of its armed forces. The recipient must have distinguished themselves at the risk of their own life above and beyond the call of duty in action against an enemy of the United States. Due to the nature of this medal, it is commonly presented posthumously.

Recipients
During the Spanish–American War, a total of 112 Medal of Honor are awarded, including 1 was awarded posthumously. 31 for Army, 66 for Navy and 15 for Marine.

Notes

References

Spanish-American War